Adams Abdul-Salam (born 16 December 1985) is a Ghanaian politician who is a member of the National Democratic Congress. He is the member of Parliament for the New Edubease Constituency in the Ashanti region.

Early life and education 
Adams Abdul-Salam was born in New Edubiase in Ashanti Region on 16 December 1985. He attended Kwame Nkrumah University of Science and Technology, Ghana where he completed with a Bachelor of Arts degree in Political Studies in 2009. Abdul-Salam holds a master's degree in Rural Development with emphasis on Rural Policy from Brandon University, Canada, completing in 2016. He is also an alumnus of Kumasi High School, which he completed in 2003.

Career

Early career 
Abdul-Salam served as a Rural Policy Officer at the Rural Development Institute, Canada and later as a Research Associate Rural Community and Mental Health Lab, Brandon University Canada.

Football administration 
He also served as an Administrative Officer at New Edubiase United Football Club. He currently serves as a board member of the club.

Politics

Parliamentary bid 
Abdul-Salam won the parliamentary bid to represent the National Democratic Congress for the New Edubease Constituency ahead of the 2020 elections in August 2019 after he went unopposed.

In December 2020, He won the New Edubease Constituency in the parliamentary elections. He won by polling 19,961 votes representing 52.4% against his closest opponent the incumbent member of parliament, George Boahen Oduro of the New Patriotic Party who obtained 17,913 votes representing 47.0% of the votes cast. The New Edubease seat was one of the seats that was taken away from the National Democratic Congress by the New Patriotic Party in the 2016 Parliamentary Elections but they couldn't retain it for an extra 4 years.

Member of Parliament 
Abdul-Salam was sworn in as Member of Parliament representing the New Edubease Constituency in the 8th Parliament of the 4th Republic of Ghana on 7 January 2021.

Committees 
He serves as a member on the Subsidiary Legislation Committee and the Local Government and Rural Development Committee of Parliament.

Personal life 
Abdul-Salam is a Muslim. His elder brother, Yakubu Abdul-Salam is the CEO, Founder and President of New Edubiase United Football Club. He is a Bissa by tribe.

Philanthropy 
In May 2022, he presented over 4,500 pieces of hand sanitizers to the people of New Edubiase Constituency during the COVID-19 pandemic in Ghana.

References

External links 

 Adams, Abdul-Salam, GhanaMPs Profile

Kumasi High School alumni
Kwame Nkrumah University of Science and Technology alumni
National Democratic Congress (Ghana) politicians
Brandon University alumni
1985 births
Living people
Ghanaian Muslims
Ghanaian MPs 2021–2025